The mud-dwelling moray, Diaphenchelys pelonates, is an eel of the family Muraenidae, and the only species in the genus Diaphenchelys. It was described by John E. McCosker and John Ernest Randall in 2007. It is a marine, tropical eel which is known from Indonesia, in the western Pacific Ocean.

References

Muraenidae
Monotypic fish genera
Fish described in 2007